Emanuel Iñiguez (born 16 September 1996) is an Argentine professional footballer who plays as a right-back for Aldosivi.

Career
Iñiguez started his career with Aldosivi. He was moved into the club's first-team squad during their promotion winning 2017–18 Primera B Nacional campaign, making his professional debut on 2 April 2018 as Aldosivi beat Villa Dálmine 1–0; he had previously been an unused substitute six times in all competitions.

Career statistics
.

Honours
Aldosivi
Primera B Nacional: 2017–18

References

External links

1996 births
Living people
Sportspeople from Buenos Aires Province
Argentine footballers
Association football defenders
Primera Nacional players
Argentine Primera División players
Aldosivi footballers